Alan Leslie Skene (2 October 1932 – 13 August 2001) was a South African dual-code international rugby union, and professional rugby league footballer who played in the 1950s and 1960s.

Background
Alan Skene was born in Cape Town, South Africa, he was a pupil at Muizenberg High School in Muizenberg, and he died aged 68 in George, Western Cape, South Africa.

Playing career

International honours
Alan Skene won a cap for South Africa (RU) while at Western Province playing inside centre against France at Ellis Park Stadium, Johannesburg on 16 August 1958, represented Rugby League XIII (RL) while at Wakefield Trinity, and won caps for South Africa (RL) while at Wakefield Trinity in 1963 against Australia (2 matches).

Championship final appearances
Alan Skene played right-, i.e. number 3, in Wakefield Trinity's 3-27 defeat by Wigan in the Championship Final during the 1959–60 season at Odsal Stadium, Bradford on Saturday 21 May 1960.

Challenge Cup Final appearances
Alan Skene played right-, i.e. number 3, and scored two tries in Wakefield Trinity's 38-5 victory over Hull F.C. in the 1959–60 Challenge Cup Final during the 1959–60 season at Wembley Stadium, London on Saturday 14 May 1960, and played right- in the 12-6 victory over Huddersfield in the 1961–62 Challenge Cup Final during the 1961–62 season at Wembley Stadium, London on Saturday 12 May 1962.

County Cup Final appearances
Alan Skene played right-, i.e. number 3, in Wakefield Trinity's 16-10 victory over Huddersfield in the 1960–61 Yorkshire County Cup Final during the 1960–61 season at Headingley Rugby Stadium, Leeds on Saturday 29 October 1960, and played right-, and scored a try in the 19-9 victory over Leeds in the 1961–62 Yorkshire County Cup Final during the 1961–62 season at Odsal Stadium, Bradford on Saturday 11 November 1961.

Club career
Alan Skene made his début for Wakefield Trinity, alongside fellow South African Jan Lotriet, in the 19-7 victory over Castleford at Wheldon Road, Castleford on Thursday 25 December 1958.

References

External links
Hall of Fame at sarugbyleague.co.za
Biography at sarugbyleague.co.za
Wakefield Win Cup 1962

1932 births
2001 deaths
Expatriate rugby league players in Australia
Expatriate rugby league players in England
Rugby league centres
Rugby league five-eighths
Rugby League XIII players
Rugby union centres
South Africa international rugby union players
South Africa national rugby league team players
South African expatriate rugby league players
South African expatriate sportspeople in Australia
South African expatriate sportspeople in England
South African rugby league players
South African rugby union players
South Sydney Rabbitohs players
Rugby union players from Cape Town
Wakefield Trinity players
South Sydney Rabbitohs captains